The J. J. Ebers Award was established in 1971 to foster progress in electron devices. It commemorates Jewell James Ebers, whose contributions, particularly to transistors, shaped the understanding and technology of electron devices. It is presented annually to one or more individuals who have made either a single or a series of contributions of recognized scientific, economic, or social significance in the broad field of electron devices. The recipient (or recipients) is awarded a certificate and check for $5,000, presented at the International Electron Devices Meeting.

Recipients
The past recipients are:

1971 John L. Moll
1972 Charles W. Mueller
1973 Herbert Kroemer
1974 Andrew S. Grove
1975 Jacques I. Pankove
1976 Marion E. Hines
1977 Anthony E. Siegman
1978 Hung C. Lin
1979 James M. Early
1980 James D. Meindl
1981 Chih-Tang Sah
1982 Arthur G. Milnes
1983 Adolf Goetzberger
1984 Izuo Hayashi
1985 Walter F. Kosonocky
1986 Pallab K. Chatterjee
1987 Robert W. Dutton
1988 Al F. Tasch Jr.
1989 Tak H. Ning
1990 Yoshiyuki Takeishi
1991 Simon Min Sze
1992 Louis C. Parrillo
1993 Karl Hess
1994 Alfred U. Macrae
1995 Martin A. Green
1996 Tetsushi Sakai
1997 Marvin H. White
1998 B. Jayant Baliga
1999 James T. Clemens
2000 Bernard S. Meyerson
2001 Hiroshi Iwai
2002 Lester F. Eastman
2003 James D. Plummer
2004 Jerry G. Fossum
2005 Bijan Davari "for contributions to deep-submicron CMOS technology and their impact on the IC industry"
2006 Ghavam Shahidi "for contributions and leadership in the development of Silicon-On-Insulator CMOS technology"
2007 Stephen J. Pearton "for developing advanced compound-semiconductor processing techniques, and clarifying the roles of defects and impurities in compound-semiconductor devices"
2008 Mark R. Pinto "for contributions to widely applied semiconductor technology simulation tools"
2009 Baruch Levush "for contributions to the development of widely applied simulation tools in the vacuum electronics industry"
2010 Mark E. Law "for contributions to widely used silicon integrated circuit process modeling"
2011 Stuart Wenham "for technical contributions and successful commercialization of high efficiency solar cells"
2012 Yuan Taur "for contributions to the advancement of several generations of CMOS process technologies"
2013 Nobukazu Teranishi "for development of the pinned photodiode concept widely used in image sensors"
2014 Joachim N. Burghartz "for contributions to integrated spiral inductors for wireless communication ICs and ultra-thin silicon devices for emerging flexible electronics"
2015 Jack Yuan-Chen Sun "for sustained leadership and technical contributions to energy efficient foundry CMOS technologies"
2016 Jaroslav Hynecek "for the pioneering work and advancement of CCD and CMOS image sensor technologies"

See also
IEEE Andrew S. Grove Award

References
Notes

Sources
 James M. Early (September 1971) Announcement: Electron Devices Group Award Established, IEEE Transactions on Electron Devices, volume ED 18, No. 9, page 613.
 IEEE Electron Devices Society J J Ebers Award

IEEE society and council awards
Awards established in 1971